The Annales Altahenses was an early medieval royal annals compiled in the Niederaltaich Abbey which contains records of the events of almost all years in the period between 708 and 1073.
In a tour de force of scholarship, Wilhelm von Giesebrecht  published a Jahrbücher des Klosters Altaich (1841), reconstructing the lost Annales Altahenses, of which fragments only were then known to be extant, obscurely included within other chronicles. The brilliance of this performance was shown in 1867, when a copy of the original chronicle was found, and it was seen that Giesebrecht's text was substantially correct.

References

Sources

Medieval Latin historical texts